Kien Nguyen (born in Nha Trang, South Vietnam, 1967) is an author who was born to a Vietnamese mother, a banker from a once wealthy family, and an American civil engineer. His mother's family, who had lost their wealth when the Americans left Vietnam, lived among neighbors who treated them as pariahs because of their background connected to the Americans, which the communist government had seen as evil capitalists. Nguyen, a child of mixed race, was especially ostracized from the community. He left Vietnam in 1985 through the United Nations "Orderly Departure Program." After spending time at a refugee camp in the Philippines, he arrived in the United States and became a dentist. He practiced dentistry in New York, NY; New York University College of Dentistry, New York, clinical instructor in general dentistry and management science. He lives in California.

Awards 
 Grinzane Cavour Prize, 1998.

Published works
The Unwanted, a Memoir of Childhood, Little Brown & Co (2001)  - The Unwanted: A Memoir of Childhood A childhood memoir, written in first person, with the reader seeing the boy grow, in South Vietnam, until the book's ending at age 18, on his way to the U.S.
The Tapestries, Little Brown & Co. (2002)  The Tapestries
Le Colonial, Little Brown & Co. (2004)  Le Colonial

References

External links
 Author's Official Website. Currently under construction. (8/13/2010)

Vietnamese emigrants to the United States
1967 births
Living people
American writers of Vietnamese descent
American male writers
People from Nha Trang